Kyle Wallack is an American ice hockey coach from West Hartford, Connecticut. He is currently the head coach for Albertus Magnus Falcons men's ice hockey team. Prior to becoming head coach at Albertus Magnus, Wallack served as the associate head coach at the University of Vermont. In May 2020 Wallack was a finalist for the head coaching position at LIU, but withdrew his name from consideration.

Playing career
Wallack was a four-year starting goaltender at Springfield College. He was captain his senior year and earned All-NECHA honors twice.

Coaching career

Indiana Ice
In 2011 the Indiana Ice of the USHL named Wallack head coach and general manager. In his only season with the Ice, Wallack led the team to a 34–15–9 record and playoff berth. With two games left in the regular season, the Ice relieved Wallack of his coaching duties.

Vermont
Vermont head coach Kevin Sneddon hired Wallack as an assistant coach in August 2012. In the summer of 2015 Wallack and assistant coach Kevin Patrick were both promoted to the position of associate head coach.

Head coaching record

References

External links
 Official Biography, Albertus Magnus Falcons

Living people
American ice hockey coaches
Ice hockey coaches from Connecticut
United States Hockey League coaches
Springfield College (Massachusetts) alumni
University of Connecticut alumni
Vermont Catamounts men's ice hockey coaches
UConn Huskies men's ice hockey coaches
Yale Bulldogs men's ice hockey coaches
Holy Cross Crusaders men's ice hockey coaches
People from West Hartford, Connecticut
Year of birth missing (living people)